People from the English city of Plymouth are known as Plymothians, or less formally as Janners. The definition of Janner is described as a person from Devon, deriving from Cousin Jan (the Devon form of John), but more particularly in naval circles anyone from the Plymouth area. The Elizabethan navigator and slave trader, Sir Francis Drake was born in nearby town of Tavistock and was the mayor of Plymouth. He was the first Englishman to circumnavigate the world and was known by the Spanish as El Draco meaning "The Dragon" after he raided many of their ships. He died of dysentery in 1596 off the coast of Panama. In 2002 a mission to recover his body and bring it to Plymouth was allowed by the Ministry of Defence. Antarctic explorers Robert Falcon Scott and Frank Bickerton both lived in the city.

Many artists have originated in Plymouth. Joshua Reynolds, the famous 18th-century portrait painter and the first president of the Royal Academy was born in Plympton, and more recently artists have included Beryl Cook whose paintings depict the culture of Plymouth and Robert Lenkiewicz, whose paintings looked at themes such as: vagrancy, sexual behaviour and suicide, lived in the city from the 1960s until his death in 2002. In addition, George Passmore of Turner Prize winning duo Gilbert & George was born in the city. Famous politicians Michael Foot and David Owen are from Plymouth and notable athletes include swimmer Sharron Davies, diver Tom Daley, dancer Wayne Sleep, 
and footballer Trevor Francis. Other past residents include composer Ron Goodwin, and journalist Angela Rippon.

People

See also 
:Category:People from Plymouth, Devon
List of people from Devon

References 

Plymouth